Korey Dropkin (born June 11, 1995) is an American curler originally from Southborough, Massachusetts.

Curling career

Juniors 
As a junior curler, Dropkin won three United States Junior Curling Championships, playing third for brother Stephen in 2012 and skipping in 2013 and 2016 while curling at Broomstones Curling Club in Wayland, MA. As such, he played for the United States at the World Junior Curling Championships, finishing 5th at the 2012 World Junior Curling Championships and 7th at the 2013 World Junior Curling Championships.

Dropkin was a member of the U.S. team at the 2012 Winter Youth Olympics, skipping a team that included Sarah Anderson, Thomas Howell and Taylor Anderson. The team finished 5th at the event; after going undefeated in the round-robin, they were eliminated in the quarter final against Italy. Dropkin did not go away from the event empty handed, as he picked up a bronze medal at the mixed doubles event with teammate Marina Verenich of Russia.

Dropkin also represented the United States at the 2013 Winter Universiade, playing lead for the Chris Plys's team. That team finished in 5th place.

Men's 
On the World Curling Tour, Dropkin has been a regular at events held in the U.S., playing in his first event at the 2010 Laphroaig Scotch Open at the age of 15. Dropkin won his first Tour event by winning the 2014 Twin Cities Open.

Dropking usually plays skip, but for two seasons from 2016 to 2018 played second for Heath McCormick. The team also included Chris Plys at third and Tom Howell at lead. During Dropkin's second season with Team McCormick, he won his first medal at the United States Men's Championship, earning silver when they lost to Greg Persinger's team in the final.

In 2019, Dropkin competed at his first World Men's Championship, as alternate for John Shuster's team. The team finished fifth, losing their first playoff game to Team Yuta Matsumura from Japan.

In 2021, Dropkin won his first United States Men's Curling Championship, which was postponed until after that year's Worlds due to the COVID-19 pandemic. The following season, he finished runner-up at the 2021 United States Olympic Curling Trials, after losing to the defending Olympic champion John Shuster rink in the final. As the 2022 US nationals were cancelled due to the pandemic, Dropkin's rink was invited to represent the US at the 2022 World Men's Curling Championship, where he led his team to a fourth place finish.

Mixed doubles 
Dropkin and long-time teammate Sarah Anderson have won the United States Mixed Doubles Championship twice, in 2015 and 2018. At the 2015 World Mixed Doubles Championship, they finished the round-robin second in their group but lost to Team Canada in the quarterfinals of the playoffs. They again made the playoffs when they returned to the Worlds in 2018, but again went winless in the playoffs, losing to Team Hungary and Team Italy to finish in 13th place. Dropkin also played with Jamie Sinclair at the 2017 United States mixed doubles curling Olympic trials, where they finished in seventh place. 

At the 2020 U.S. Mixed Doubles Championship, Dropkin and Anderson lost to Joe Polo and Tabitha Peterson, the eventual champions, in the semifinals, but defeated Monica Walker and Alex Leichter to win the bronze medal.

Dropkin and Anderson played in the 2021 United States mixed doubles curling Olympic trials, where they finished in third, losing to Jamie Sinclair and Rich Ruohonen in the semifinal.

Personal life
Dropkin currently is a student at the University of Minnesota-Duluth. He is also employed as a landscaper and curling instructor, while currently starting a career in the real estate business. He lives in Duluth, Minnesota.

Teams

Men's

Mixed doubles

Mixed

Grand Slam record

References

External links

1995 births
Living people
People from Southborough, Massachusetts
Sportspeople from Worcester County, Massachusetts
Sportspeople from Duluth, Minnesota
American male curlers
Continental Cup of Curling participants
Curlers at the 2012 Winter Youth Olympics
Youth Olympic bronze medalists for the United States